Federica Carta (born 10 January 1999) is an Italian singer-songwriter and TV personality.

In 2017, she came third in the 16th series of the Italian talent show Amici di Maria De Filippi. Since that time the singer has released three top-five albums and several successful singles and collaborations, selling over 360,000 copies in Italy.

Carta participated in the Sanremo Music Festival in 2019 with the song "Senza farlo apposta" together with Italian rapper Shade, and worked as a songwriter with Elisa, Laura Pausini, Federica Abbate, Roberto Casalino and Alessandro Raina.

Biography and music career 
Federica Carta was born in Rome on 10 January 1999 to a family of Sardinian origin. At the age of nine she became passionate about music influenced by her father Cristiano. She took singing and piano lessons.

At the age of 17, after having participated in a number of competitions, Carta decided to seek selection for the TV show Amici di Maria De Filippi, presenting for the first time on TV three of her unpublished songs, "Sogni e verità", "People talk to me" and "Tutto quello che ho". As a member of the blue team, Federica finished in third place.

On 19 May 2017, she released her first studio album Federica, produced by Andrea Rigonat for the Universal Music Group. The album has many songwriters and composers as of the team coach Elisa, Federica Abbate and Roberto Casalino. It reached third place on the FIMI chart and obtained a platinum certification.  It contains songs presented to Amici: "Dopotutto" and "Ti avrei voltu dire", both certified gold records. During the summer of 2017 she performed in several festivals and she collaborated on the hit "Irraggiungibile" with Shade, achieving second place in the Italian Singles Charts and selling over 150,000 copies.

The singer tried to take participate, together with the band La Rua, at the Sanremo Music Festival 2018, but was unsuccessful. The single, titled "Sull'orlo di una crisi d'amore", was released on 23 March 2018. In January 2018, Top Music, the television version of the official Top of the Music official record chart of the Federazione Industria Musicale Italiana, was broadcast on Rai Gulp. On 1 February 2018 "Molto più di un film" was released as the leading single from her second studio album Molto più di un film, published on 23 April. The album hit the FIMI charts at fourth place. On 5 June 2018 she published the book Mai così felice (Never so happy), in which the singer talks about herself, her emotions, love and family. Federica opened four concerts of Laura Pausini during summer.

On 14 December 2018, the singer released "Mondovisione" from the soundtrack of the Michele Soavi film The Legend of the Christmas Witch. On 21 December 2018, her participation in the Sanremo Music Festival 2019 was announced with the song "Senza farlo apposta", with Shade. The collaboration peaked at number 5 in the Italian Singles Chart and was awarded a platinum certification. On 15 February 2019 her third studio album, Popcorn, was published. It debuted in third place on the FIMI's chart and became the singer's third consecutive album to reach into Top5.

On 6 March 2020, Federica released "Bullshit", the first single from her fourth album, which will be released in 2020 for Island Records.

Influences 
The singer stated during interviews that artists who influenced her are Alicia Keys, Paolo Nutini, Dua Lipa and Billie Eilish. As musical influences she appreciates pop, neo soul, R&B and soul music. The singer has described Laura Pausini and Elisa as main points in the contemporary Italian music scene.

Discography

Studio albums 
 Federica (2017)
 Molto più di un film (2018)
 Popcorn (2019)

Singles 
 "Attraversando gli anni" (2016)
 "Ti avrei voluto dire" (2017)
 "Dopotutto" (2017)
 "Forte e chiaro" (2017)
 "Molto più di un film" (2018)
 "Sull'orlo di una crisi d'amore" with La Rua (2018)
 "Tra noi è infinita" (2018)
 "Amarsi è una cosa normale" (2018)
 "Mondovisione" (2018)
 "Senza farlo apposta" with Shade (2019)
 "Bullshit" (2020)
 "Easy" (2020)
 "Morositas" (2020)
 "Mostro" (2021)
 "Tocca a me" with Mydrama (2021)

 As featured artist
 "Irraggiungibile" with Shade (2017)
 "Bella così" with Chadia Rodríguez (2020)

Television 
 Amici di Maria De Filippi, sixteen edition (Canale 5, 2017)  contestant - third place
 Top Music (Rai Gulp, 2018–present) presenter
 Sanremo Music Festival (Rai 1, 2019) contestant

References

Italian pop singers
Living people
21st-century Italian singers
Singers from Rome
1999 births
21st-century Italian women singers
Italian singer-songwriters